David, Dave or Davey Whitney may refer to:

People
 David Whitney (1939–2005), art critic, curator, collector as well as life partner of architect Philip Johnson
 David Russell, 5th Baron Ampthill, town councillor
 David Whitney (actor)
 Davey Whitney (1930–2015), American college basketball coach

Buildings
 David Whitney House (1894), a Detroit, Michigan house
 David Whitney Building (1915), a skyscraper in Detroit, Michigan
 Davey Whitney Complex (1975), Alcorn State University arena

See also
 David (disambiguation)
 Whitney (disambiguation)